Samuel Stretton (1731 – 11 May 1811) was a builder and architect in Nottingham who is noted for building the first powered cotton mill.

Family

He appears to have been born at Longdon Staffordshire in 1731 or 1732 and moved to Lenton in 1750, where he was married and where all his children were baptized.

On 14 July 1754 he married Elizabeth Wombwell in Lenton. The marriage produced 6 children:
 William Stretton April 1755 – 12 March 1828
 Ann 1757 – 11 April 1820     
 Elizabeth 1759
 Mary 1760
 Samuel Stretton 1761
 Sarah 1763

His wife Elizabeth died on 22 February 1802 and was buried at Lenton. He died on 11 May 1811, and was buried on 16 May at Lenton.

Career

He carried on the business of a builder to Nottingham, at first on his own account, and later in partnership with his son William Stretton,

Buildings by Samuel Stretton include:
1769–1772 the first powered Cotton Mill erected in England, driven by horses turning a capstan.
1776 Colwick Hall 
1777 the Grand Stand on Nottingham Racecourse.
1789 Nottingham Town Jail.
1792 Evans, Storer and Green Brewery, Poplar Place, Lenton, Nottingham at a cost of £15,000 (equivalent to £ as of ),. This brewery only survived for two years.
1792 Lenton Hall, now part of Hugh Stewart Hall at the University of Nottingham.

References

18th-century English architects
1731 births
1811 deaths
Architects from Nottingham
People from Longdon, Staffordshire
People from Lenton, Nottingham